Pleume was a town of the Chalcidice in ancient Macedonia. It belonged to the Delian League since it appears in the tribute records of Athens between 434/3 and 429/8 BCE, where it paid a phoros of 1000 drachmas, as well as in a tributary decree of 422/1 BCE.

Its site is located in the northwestern part of the Chalcidice.

References

Populated places in ancient Macedonia
Former populated places in Greece
Geography of ancient Chalcidice
Members of the Delian League